Martin Lee  (born 13 January 1978) is an English former professional tennis player. Born in London, he resides in Marlow, Buckinghamshire.

Tennis career
Lee was a promising junior, reaching No. 1 in the world junior rankings. In 1995 he won the Boys Doubles at Wimbledon. A left-hander, he turned pro in 1996. He struggled with constant knee and groin problems throughout his career, which eventually forced his retirement from the professional circuit in November 2006.

Lee's best singles result on the ATP Tour was to reach the final of the Hall of Fame Championships in Newport, Rhode Island in 2001. On 11 March 2002, Lee achieved his career-high singles ranking of World No. 94, establishing himself as the British number three behind Tim Henman and Greg Rusedski. It was the first time in 23 years that Britain had three players in the Top 100. However, in November 2002 he underwent knee surgery and was out of action for 10 months, and his ranking never recovered.

Lee reached the second round of the men's singles at Wimbledon four times, in 1997, 2000, 2001 and 2006. He appeared in the US Open in 2001, and managed to take two sets off of seeded player Sjeng Schalken, however the Dutchman prevailed 6–3 in the deciding set. Lee's ranking also ensured automatic qualification for the main draw of the Australian and French Opens in 2002, but he lost in the first round on both occasions. Overall he won 21 and lost 46 ATP Tour matches.

Lee won two of his three matches for Great Britain in the Davis Cup, however these were only dead rubbers. Lee lost his only live match against Thailand's Paradorn Srichaphan in straight sets.

ATP career finals

Singles: 1 (1 runner-up)

ATP Challenger and ITF Futures finals

Singles: 6 (2–4)

Doubles: 15 (5–10)

Performance timeline

Singles

Junior Grand Slam finals

Doubles: 2 (1 title, 1 runner-up)

References

External links
 
 
 

English male tennis players
People educated at Worthing High School
People from Maidenhead
1978 births
Living people
Wimbledon junior champions
British male tennis players
Tennis people from Greater London
Grand Slam (tennis) champions in boys' doubles